Heydarabad (also Romanized as Ḩeydarābād and Haidarābād) is a village in Almeh Rural District, Samalqan District, Maneh and Samalqan County, North Khorasan Province, Iran. At the 2006 census, its population was 516, in 147 families.

References 

Populated places in Maneh and Samalqan County